Albert Blithe (June 25, 1923 – December 17, 1967) was an American career soldier who served as a private first class with Easy Company, 2nd Battalion, 506th Parachute Infantry Regiment, in the 101st Airborne Division during World War II. He served again with the Airborne during the Korean War and was twice decorated for gallantry. He eventually rose to the rank of Master Sergeant in the Army. Blithe was portrayed in the HBO miniseries Band of Brothers by Marc Warren. His life story was featured in the 2010 book A Company of Heroes: Personal Memories about the Real Band of Brothers and the Legacy They Left Us.

Youth
Blithe was born and raised in Philadelphia, Pennsylvania. After completing 3 years of high school, he enlisted for the paratroopers on August 18, 1942, in his hometown.

Military service

World War II
Blithe trained at Camp Toccoa, Georgia, in August 1942 under Captain Herbert Sobel. Blithe jumped with the rest of Easy Company into occupied France as part of the massive Airborne invasion; however, when he landed, he found himself lost. Blithe was joined by a number of other paratroopers who were also part of the mis-drops. They teamed up together and found the rest of Easy Company.

As portrayed in Band of Brothers by Marc Warren, Blithe was struck with a temporary case of hysterical blindness following the fierce fight to capture Carentan. He recovered and was part of a patrol investigating a farmhouse a few days later, where he was shot in the collar bone by a sniper. He recovered from the wound and received a Purple Heart on June 25, 1944. Due to his wound, on October 1, 1944, he was sent home and never returned to the European Theater of Operations. As a result of his service in World War II and Korea, Blithe received the Silver Star, Bronze Star (with 2 oak leaf clusters).

Blithe was released from the Army Hospital October 8, 1945, which has been verified by his discharge paperwork at the end of World War II. He attended the 1st annual reunion of the 101st Airborne Division Association. He returned to Philadelphia, Pennsylvania, and started a career with Westinghouse Electric.

Korean War and afterward
Blithe also served in Korea with the 187th Airborne Regimental Combat Team where he was awarded a bronze and silver star for jumping behind enemy lines surrounded by a Chinese battalion. He was later assigned to the Military Assistance Advisory Group in Taiwan. He never retired from military service.

Death
On December 10, 1967, while on active duty in Germany, Blithe felt nauseated when he returned from a weekend at Bastogne, Belgium, where he had taken part in the ceremonies commemorating the Battle of the Bulge. On December 11, 1967, Blithe was taken to the emergency room at Wiesbaden Hospital, Germany, where he was admitted with a diagnosis of a perforated ulcer. He died in the intensive care unit on December 17 after surgery, and was buried in Arlington National Cemetery with full honors.

References

Bibliography

External links

 ANC Explorer
 Blithe in Taiwan from Currahee website
 The Battle of Normandy

1923 births
1967 deaths
Band of Brothers characters
Burials at Arlington National Cemetery
Deaths from kidney failure
Deaths from peritonitis
Military personnel from Philadelphia
Recipients of the Silver Star
United States Army personnel of World War II
United States Army soldiers